Feliksów is a village in the administrative district of Gmina Wiskitki, which is located within Żyrardów County of Masovian Voivodeship in east-central Poland.

References

Villages in Żyrardów County